Fillmore Consolidated Township (informally Fillmore Township) is a township located in Montgomery County, Illinois, United States. As of the 2010 census, its population was 616 and it contained 290 housing units.

History
In 2016, Fillmore Township and South Fillmore Township voted to merge into Fillmore Consolidated Township.

Geography

Demographics

Township Officials
Fillmore Consolidated Township elected its most recent board during the April 2017 consolidated election. Two officeholders from Fillmore Township, the Supervisor and Clerk, were reelected while a new highway commissioner and four new trustees were elected.

Ɨ Served in this position prior to the consolidation with South Fillmore Township.

References

External links
City-data.com
Illinois State Archives
Historical Society of Montgomery County

Townships in Montgomery County, Illinois
1872 establishments in Illinois
Townships in Illinois